The Transylvanian School was a cultural movement which was founded after part of the Romanian Orthodox Church in Habsburg-ruled Transylvania accepted the leadership of the pope and became the Greek-Catholic Church. The links with Rome brought to the Romanian Transylvanians the ideas of the Age of Enlightenment. The Transylvanian School's major centres were in the cities of Blaj (Balázsfalva), Oradea (Nagyvárad), Lugoj (Lugos) and Beiuș (Belényes).

Overview

Within a span of fifty years, the majority national group in the Principality of Transylvania, the Romanians, succeeded in documenting their Latin origins, rewriting their 
history, language, and grammar, and building the pedagogical foundation needed to educate and gain political rights for its members within the Habsburg Empire.
Its members contemplated the origin of Romanians from a scientific point of view, bringing historical and philological arguments in favour of the thesis that the Transylvanian Romanians were the direct descendants of the Roman colonists brought in Dacia after its conquest in early 2nd century AD. The historical discourse and all the contributions of the Transylvanian School had a purpose, a program pursued and gradually put into practice by three generations of Romanian Transylvanian intellectuals. It was a project devised by the generation of Gherontie Cotore and Grigorie Maior, yet started by Samuil Micu-Klein. Micu-Klein gradually gathered and systematized the internal chronicles and the general plan of the historical discourse of the Transylvanian School in his works, "Brevis Historia Notitia" (Short historical notice), "Scurtã cunoştințã a istoriei românilor" (Brief presentation of the history of the Romanians), "Istoria românilor cu întrebãri şi rãspunsuri" (A history of the Romanians with questions and answers), and the ample synthesis "Istoria românilor" (History of the Romanians).

The Transylvanian School had a notable impact in the Romanian culture of both Transylvania, but also of the Romanians living across the Carpathians, in Wallachia and Moldavia, leading to the national awakening of Romania.

Micu-Klein, Gheorghe Șincai, Petru Maior and Ion Budai-Deleanu, who were members of the Transylvanian School during the era of Romanian national awakening, emphasised the ancient purely Latin origin of Romanians to enhance the political and cultural prestige of Romanians in Western Europe. In 1791, they contributed in the memorandum: "Supplex Libellus Valachorum Transsilvaniae". In this memorandum, they demanded similar rights for the Transylvanian Romanians as those enjoyed by the (largely) Hungarian nobility, the enfranchised Saxon patrician class, and the free military Székelys under the Union of the Three Nations. This document was presented to Emperor Leopold II by the Transylvanian School.

The Transylvanian School created the current phonetic system of the Romanian alphabet based on the Latin alphabet, largely derived from the Italian and the French alphabets. This replaced the use of the medieval Romanian Cyrillic alphabet as well as the previously Latin alphabet based phonetic system which had been based on the Hungarian alphabet. Another notable contribution of the Transylvanian School was the usage of the first French and Italian neologisms.

The Transylvanian School believed that the Romanians and the Aromanians were part of the same ethnic group. Its teachings influenced some prominent Aromanian figures such as Nicolae Ianovici or Gheorghe Constantin Roja.

Notable members 
Petru Maior
Samuil Micu
Gheorghe Șincai
Ion Budai-Deleanu
August Treboniu Laurian
George Bariț

See also
 "Supplex Libellus Valachorum"

References

 
Romanian culture
Age of Enlightenment
Culture of Transylvania